Violin Vasu is an Indian classical music violinist, music teacher, researcher and a social activist. He belongs to the sixth generation of Saint Tyagaraja Sishya Parampara (lineage) and teaches at IIT Hyderabad.

Early life
Dr. D.V.K. Vasudevan (Violin Vasu), was born in Vijayawada. He had his initial and intermediate level music training from Sri VVL Narasimha Rao and advanced training under Sri Annavarapu Ramaswamy. During his college days, he was an active participant in various national level Youth Movements such as National Cadet Corps where he represented the state in Republic Day Parade in 1998, National Service Scheme and Bharat Scouts and Guides in which he received the Rastrapathi award from the then President of India Dr. A.P.J Abdul Kalam.

Education

Having completed his M.Sc in Information Technology in The Institute of Advanced Studies in Education (IASE) in Sardarshahar, Rajasthan in 2005, and Masters of Music from the University of Madras in 2015, Vasudevan obtained his PhD from University of Mysore under the guidance of Dr. Mysore Manjunath.

His other vocational achievements include the prestigious Sangeethalankar from Akhil Bharatiya Gandharva Mahavidyalaya Mandal and two diplomas in carnatic violin and vocal music from P.S Telugu University and in Music Education (TTC in Music) from A.P. Govt. Technical Board. He also completed his 8th Grade in Western Music Theory from Trinity College London and has cleared the National Eligibility Test (NET) in Music conducted by University Grants Commission.

Teaching and publications

Vasudevan is a music teacher and cultural coordinator in University of Hyderabad  and a visiting faculty in IIIT-H, where he designed a musical curriculum which was adopted by Jawahar Bal Bhavan, an initiative of the Government of Andhra Pradesh (GoAP).

Apart from receiving the Outstanding Artistes Research Fellowship from the Ministry of Culture, he holds research publications 'A study of Violin', a case study of violin usage in Carnatic music, and 'Interpreting Tyagaraja Pancharatna Keerthanas', a scholarly work of English and Telugu compilations of the Pancharatna kritis with word by word translations and musical notations.

He authored the book Jeevana Vidya  that deals with various human values through examples from the life story of Mahatma Gandhi, in a series of 23 chapters.

Music career

Vasu trained under the tutelage of legendary violinist Dr. Annavarapu Ramaswamy. He created a musical troupe, teaming up with his friend Dronendra Phani Kumar on the flute, called DevanDrone, the name being derived out of both their names. They performed in the Festival of Living Heritage, at Chowmahalla palace in October 2008, in which the legendary musician Dr. M. Balamuralikrishna also performed a solo-show. Devandrone was the only Indian team to perform at the World Wood Day Music Festival  held at Long Beach, CA, USA. He was a part of the Indian contingent that participated in Namaste France 2016.

He also runs   Gurukulam, a vocal and violin music academy for Carnatic music.

Social activities

Violin Vasu is the founder of Sanskriti Foundation, a registered NGO set up to promote Indian music, tradition and culture. One of its better known initiatives is the Sabarmathi Sangeeth, started in 2006 in association with Andhra Pradesh Tourism Development Corporation, which is a series of adhoc workshops popularizing Mahatma Gandhi's bhajans and inculcating strong character in people. It has directly covered about 25,000 children, juveniles, and prisoners till date. It was also aired in television as a series of 24 episodes reaching around 10 lakhs people in undivided Andhra Pradesh.

He is the chief organizer of the Hyderabad Tyagaraja Aaradhana Music Festival (HTAMF), an annual concert featuring performances from musicians in and around Hyderabad.

Awards

1. Outstanding Artistes Research Fellowship from Ministry of Culture, Govt. of India. 
Given to artists with potential in undertaking research activities in music.

2.  Samaikya Bharat Gaurav Puraskar (Eminent personalities) - Madras Telugu Academy.
Given to person for rendering extraordinary activities for national integration (chosen in the field
of music).

3. International Award for Young People (Gold Standard) - Prince Philip, London.
Given to youth showing promising signs in overall development. (Chose music as special skill).

4. Rastrapathi Award in Bharat Scouts and Guides from Dr. APJ Abdul Kalam.
  
5. Award of Professional Excellence in 2017 by Indywood Film Carnival.

References 

Indian violinists
1979 births
Living people
21st-century violinists